Integrator complex subunit 5 is a protein that in humans is encoded by the INTS5 gene.

Function

The Integrator complex is a complex that associates with the C-terminal domain of RNA polymerase II large subunit. This complex is brought to U1 and U2 small nuclear RNA genes, where it is involved in the transcription and processing of their transcripts. The protein encoded by this gene represents a subunit of the Integrator complex.

References

Further reading